Charles Miossec (25 December 1938 – 12 April 2020) was a French politician.

Miossec was born on 25 December 1938 in Lanhouarneau. The family moved to Paris, as his father was a member of the Republican Guard. Miossec finished business school, and began work for Rhône-Poulenc. By 1963, he returned to Finistère and worked for the Guével winery in Pleyber-Christ. He served on the Loc-Eguiner-Saint-Thégonnec municipal council. Miossec won his first election to the National Assembly in 1978, succeeding Yves Michel, who was himself completing the term of Antoine Caill, who had died in office. Throughout his tenure as a deputy, Miossec represented Finistère's 5th constituency and was affiliated with Rally for the Republic. Miossec faced opposition only in 1997, his final reelection campaign, defeating mayor of Landerneau .

Miossec was elected to the Finistère general council in 1982 and served as president of the body from 1988 to 1998. He replaced Louis Orvoën and was succeeded by Pierre Maille. Miossec was mayor of Landivisiau between 1983 and 2001. In this role, he succeeded Yves Queguiner and proceeded Georges Tigréat. Following his retirement from politics, Miossec was awarded knighthood of the Legion of Honor in 2002, and named honorary mayor of Landivisiau in 2005. He died on 12 April 2020, aged 81.

References

1938 births
2020 deaths
Rally for the Republic politicians
Deputies of the 6th National Assembly of the French Fifth Republic
Deputies of the 7th National Assembly of the French Fifth Republic
Deputies of the 8th National Assembly of the French Fifth Republic
Deputies of the 9th National Assembly of the French Fifth Republic
Deputies of the 10th National Assembly of the French Fifth Republic
Deputies of the 11th National Assembly of the French Fifth Republic
Chevaliers of the Légion d'honneur
Mayors of places in Brittany
People from Finistère